Dmitry Komornikov (born 28 July 1981) is a Russian swimmer who competed in the 2000 Summer Olympics, in the 2004 Summer Olympics, and in the 2008 Summer Olympics.

On 15 June 2003, Komornikov set the world record in the long course men's 200 breaststroke at the Mare Nostrum Barcelona meet, with a 2:09.52.

See also
World record progression 200 metres breaststroke

References

1981 births
Living people
Russian male swimmers
Male breaststroke swimmers
Olympic swimmers of Russia
Swimmers at the 2000 Summer Olympics
Swimmers at the 2004 Summer Olympics
Swimmers at the 2008 Summer Olympics
Place of birth missing (living people)
World Aquatics Championships medalists in swimming
Medalists at the FINA World Swimming Championships (25 m)
European Aquatics Championships medalists in swimming
Goodwill Games medalists in swimming
Competitors at the 2001 Goodwill Games